Moira Shannon Quirk (born October 30, 1968 in Rutland, England) is an English actress and comedian. As an audiobook narrator, she has won four Audie Awards.

Personal life and education 
Quirk was born on October 30, 1968 in Rutland, England. She received honours degree in English and Drama from Westfield College, University of London and Central School of Speech and Drama.  After graduation, she moved to Orlando, Florida.

Quirk married comedian Michael Rayner on May 26, 1996. The couple moved to Los Angeles in the late 1990s. They have two daughters.

Career
Early in her career, Quirk took voice acting lessons from Susan Blu and Charlie Adler.

After graduating from Westfield College, University of London and Central School of Speech and Drama, Quirk moved to Orlando, Florida, where she worked at Walt Disney World and Universal Studios Florida. Through this work, she became connected with Nickelodeon Studios. There, she became co-host and referee for Nickelodeon Guts for four seasons. She was also the hostess of the children's TV series Angelina Ballerina: The Next Steps.

Quirk is also known as the voice of Brit Crust in the Nickelodeon animated series My Life as a Teenage Robot, as well as the voice of CHIPS in The Radio Adventures of Dr. Floyd. Moira also appeared in the game Mercenaries: Playground of Destruction, as the voice of the news reporter Adriana Livingston. She also voiced Daniella in the video game Haunting Ground, as well as Susie Smythe and Mei Ling on two episodes of What's New, Scooby Doo?.

Quirk has additionally voiced several minor characters on popular animated series, such as Codename: Kids Next Door and Johnny Bravo.

She has voiced the character Karliah in the role-playing video game The Elder Scrolls V: Skyrim, as well as Elara Dorne in Bioware's MMORPG, Star Wars: The Old Republic, Elhaym "Elly" van Houten in Xenogears, and Dr. Moira Vahlen in XCOM: Enemy Unknown and its expansion, Enemy Within. Quirk has also appeared in The Bard's Tale and provides the voices of The Emissary of the Nine, The Exo Stranger (A.K.A. Elisabeth Bray) in Destiny 2, Tidepool in Skylanders: Imaginators, and some female extras in Destiny 2. She voiced Vipsania and other characters in the 2005 Capcom game, Shadow of Rome.

She also provided additional voices for Happy Feet Two, portrayed Phyla-Vell on The Avengers: Earth's Mightiest Heroes, Hannahr the blacksmith in DreamWorks Dragons: Rescue Riders, and voiced characters in Kingdoms of Amalur: Reckoning action role-playing video game.

Awards and honors

Filmography

Film

Television

Video games

References

External links
 
 

Living people
Alumni of the Royal Central School of Speech and Drama
Audiobook narrators
English film actresses
English radio actresses
English stage actresses
English television actresses
English television personalities
English video game actresses
English voice actresses
English women comedians
People from Rutland
20th-century English actresses
21st-century English actresses
20th-century English comedians
21st-century English comedians
1968 births